Adiantum sinicum is a fern species in the Vittarioideae subfamily of the Pteridaceae. It is endemic to China.  Its natural habitat is subtropical or tropical moist lowland forests. It is threatened by habitat loss.

References

sinicum
Flora of China
Endangered plants
Taxonomy articles created by Polbot
Plants described in 1949